protein S6 kinase, 90kDa, polypeptide 3, also s RPS6KA3, is an enzyme that in humans is encoded by the RPS6KA3  gene.

Function 

This gene encodes a member of the RSK (ribosomal S6 kinase) family of serine/threonine kinases. This kinase contains 2 non-identical kinase catalytic domains and phosphorylates various substrates, including members of the mitogen-activated kinase (MAPK) signalling pathway. The activity of this protein has been implicated in controlling cell growth and differentiation.

Clinical significance 

Mutations in this gene have been associated with Coffin–Lowry syndrome (CLS).

Interactions 

RPS6KA3 has been shown to interact with CREB-binding protein, MAPK1 and PEA15.

References

Further reading

External links 
  GeneReviews/NCBI/NIH/UW entry on Coffin–Lowry syndrome

EC 2.7.11